Valeria Ortuño Martínez (born 27 May 1998) is a Mexican racewalker. She competed in the women's 20 kilometres walk event at the 2019 World Athletics Championships held in Doha, Qatar. She finished in 32nd place with a time of 1:43:51. She also competed in the same event at the 2022 World Athletics Championships held in Eugene, Oregon, United States.

In 2014, she won the silver medal in the girls' 5 kilometre walk at the Summer Youth Olympics held in Nanjing, China.

References

External links 
 

Living people
1998 births
Place of birth missing (living people)
Mexican female racewalkers
World Athletics Championships athletes for Mexico
Athletes (track and field) at the 2014 Summer Youth Olympics
Athletes (track and field) at the 2020 Summer Olympics
Olympic athletes of Mexico
20th-century Mexican women
21st-century Mexican women